Joseph Patrick Cranshaw (June 17, 1919 – December 28, 2005) was an American character actor known for his distinctive look and deadpan humor. He is best known for one of his last roles, that of Joseph "Blue" Pulaski, a fraternity brother, in the 2003 hit comedy Old School. Some sources state that this role gave him "pop-culture status".

Early life
Cranshaw was born in Bartlesville, Oklahoma, and became interested in acting while entertaining American troops as a member of the Army Air Forces before World War II.

Career
Cranshaw began his screen acting career in 1955 when he was 36 in the uncredited role of a bar tender at a dance in the western Texas Lady.

Despite an acting span of more than 40 years and some 102 appearances, Cranshaw's first credited film role came at the age of 41, in The Amazing Transparent Man (1960). Cranshaw's mild-mannered and gentlemanly demeanor led him to a number of roles as bank tellers, store managers, and grandfathers. His major credits include Bonnie and Clyde (1967), Bandelero! (1968) Sgt. Pepper's Lonely Hearts Club Band (1978), Pee-Wee's Big Adventure (1985), Moving (1988), The Hudsucker Proxy (1994), Everyone Says I Love You (1996), Nothing to Lose (1997), Almost Heroes (1998), Broken Vessels (1998), Best in Show (2000), Bubble Boy (2001),  and Old School (2003). He appeared in more than 50 television series, including Alice and After MASH.

Death
Cranshaw died of pneumonia at his Fort Worth, Texas home, aged 86.

Selected filmography

The Amazing Transparent Man (1960) - Security Guard
The Yesterday Machine (1963) 
Under Age (1964) - W.J. Earnhardt 
Bonnie and Clyde (1967) - Bank Teller (uncredited)
Bandolero! (1968) - Bank Clerk
Adam-12 (1974) - Jealous Husband
Nightmare Honeymoon (1974) - Old Bail Boy
Slumber Party '57 (1976) - Store Owner
Thunder and Lightning (1977) - Taylor
Sgt. Pepper's Lonely Hearts Club Band (1978) - Western Union Messenger
The New Adventures of Wonder Woman (1979) - Codger
The Dukes of Hazard (1979-80) - Doc Petticord
The Private Eyes (1980) - Roy
The Gong Show Movie (1980) - Man Dying In Elevator
CHiPs (1980) Kidnap - Carpenter 
Yes, Giorgio (1982) - Man on Gurney
Diff’rent Strokes (1983) - Old Man as Arnold Jackson
After M*A*S*H (1983) - Veteran Bob Scannell
Wayne's World (1992)
The Beverly Hillbillies (1993) - Reverend Mason
The Hudsucker Proxy (1994) - Ancient Sorter
Everyone Says I Love You (1996) - Grandpa
Nothing to Lose (1997) - Henry
Broken Vessels (1998) - Gramps
Almost Heroes (1998) - Jackson 
Just Shoot Me! (1998) - Cowboy Pete
MVP: Most Valuable Primate (2000) - Ron 
Best in Show (2000) - Leslie Ward Cabot
Bubble Boy (2001) - Pappy / Pippy
MVP: Most Vertical Primate (2001) - Ron
Air Bud: Seventh Inning Fetch (2002) - Sheriff Bob
Frank McKlusky, C.I. (2002) - The Old Man
Old School (2003) - Blue
Air Bud: Spikes Back (2003) - Sheriff Bob
My Boss's Daughter (2003) - Old Man
Breakin' All the Rules (2004) - Mr. Lynch
Herbie: Fully Loaded (2005) - Jimmy D.
Air Buddies (2006) - Sheriff Bob (final film role, posthumous release)

References

External links

1919 births
2005 deaths
American male film actors
American male television actors
People from Bartlesville, Oklahoma
Male actors from Fort Worth, Texas
Male actors from Oklahoma
Deaths from pneumonia in Texas
20th-century American male actors
21st-century American male actors